PA11 may refer to:
 Pennsylvania Route 11
 Pennsylvania Route 11 (1920s)
 Pennsylvania's 11th congressional district
 Piper PA-11, a light aircraft
 Polyamide 11, or Nylon 11